Todd Martin was the defending champion but lost to Ivan Ljubičić in the second round.

Lleyton Hewitt won the title, defeating Jason Stoltenberg 6–4, 6–0 in the final.

Seeds

Draw

Finals

Top half

Bottom half

References

 Main Draw

Adidas International
Adidas